King's College or The King's College refers to two higher education institutions in the United Kingdom:
King's College, Cambridge, a constituent of the University of Cambridge
King's College London, a constituent of the University of London

It can also refer to:

Australia
King's College, University of Queensland, in St Lucia, Brisbane
King's College, Warrnambool, an independent coeducational Presbyterian school
King's College, a former school now incorporated into Pembroke School, Adelaide

Canada
University of King's College, in Halifax, Nova Scotia
King's University College (University of Western Ontario), in London, Ontario
The King's University (Edmonton), formerly King's University College
King's College, the predecessor institution to the University of New Brunswick
King's College, the predecessor institution to the University of Toronto

United Kingdom
King's College, Aberdeen, the oldest part of the University of Aberdeen
King's College School, Cambridge, a preparatory school linked to King's College, Cambridge
King's College, Guildford, an International Baccalaureate school
King's College, Newcastle, a former college of Durham University, which left to form Newcastle University
King's College, Taunton, a private boarding secondary school in Taunton, Somerset
King's College Hospital, a hospital in the Borough of Southwark, London
King's College School, Wimbledon, London, a leading Eton Group school founded by King George IV linked to King's College London

United States
King's College (New York), the colonial-era name of Columbia College, part of Columbia University
King's College (Charlotte, North Carolina) in Charlotte, North Carolina
King's College (Pennsylvania) in Wilkes-Barre, Pennsylvania
The King's College (New York City), a Christian liberal arts college in New York City
The King's University (Texas) in Southlake, Texas, also known as "The King's College"

Other locations
King's College, Auckland, New Zealand
King's College Budo, in Wakiso district, Uganda
King's College, Hong Kong, a secondary school in Hong Kong
King's College, Kathmandu, Nepal
King's College, Lagos,  Nigeria
King's College, Madrid, Spain
King's College, Panama, a British international school

See also
Kings International College, a secondary school in Camberley, Surrey
Oriel College, Oxford, known as King's College from about 1326 to 1526
Eton College,  founded in 1440 by King Henry VI as "The King's College of Our Lady of Eton besides Wyndsor"
King's School (disambiguation)
Kings (disambiguation)
 King College (disambiguation)
King's University College (disambiguation)
King's University (disambiguation)